Bohdaneč is a municipality and village in Kutná Hora District in the Central Bohemian Region of the Czech Republic. It has about 400 inhabitants.

Administrative parts
Villages and hamlets of Dvorecko, Kotoučov, Prostřední Ves, Řeplice and Šlechtín are administrative parts of Bohdaneč.

History
The first written mention of Bohdaneč is from 1233. In 1514, Bohdaneč was promoted to a market town by Vladislaus II of Hungary, but lost the title after the World War II. Dvorecko was first mentioned in 1487 under name Víceměřič, Kotoučov in 1525, and Prostřední Ves and Řeplice in 1381.

Šlechtín was a part of Prostřední Ves. In 1960, the municipalities of Dvorecko, Kotoučov, Prostřední Ves and Řeplice were merged with Bohdaneč.

Gallery

References

External links

Villages in Kutná Hora District